The 1982–83 Football League Cup (known as the Milk Cup for sponsorship reasons) was the 23rd season of the Football League Cup, a knockout competition for England's top 92 football clubs. The competition started on 30 August 1982 and ended with the final on 26 March 1983. The final was contested by First Division teams Manchester United and Liverpool at the Wembley Stadium in London.

First round

First Leg

Second Leg

Second round

First Leg

Second Leg

Third round

Ties

Replays

Fourth round

Ties

Replay

Fifth Round

Ties

Semi-finals
Manchester United, in search of their first League Cup triumph, overcame Arsenal in the semi-finals to reach the final for the first time. A 4–2 win at Highbury was followed by a 2–1 win at Old Trafford. Liverpool, winners of the previous two finals, booked their place in the final for the third year running at the expense of Second Division strugglers Burnley, winning the first leg 3–0 at Anfield. Burnley's 1–0 win at Turf Moor in the second leg wasn't enough to prevent Liverpool from getting through.

First Leg

Second Leg

Final

References

General

Specific

EFL Cup seasons
1982–83 domestic association football cups
Lea
Cup